Wełtyń  (German Woltin) is a village in the administrative district of Gmina Gryfino, within Gryfino County, West Pomeranian Voivodeship, in north-western Poland, close to the German border.

The village has an approximate population of 1000.

See also
History of Pomerania

References

Villages in Gryfino County